R407 road  may refer to:
 R407 road (Ireland)
 R407 road (South Africa)